The Ministry of Defense is (MoD; Arabic: وزارة الدفاع) is a government ministry of Yemen that is responsible for the Yemen Armed Forces. The current minister of defense is Lt. Gen. Mohsen Mohammed al-Daeri, who was appointed on 28 July 2022. The main headquarters of the Ministry is in Sana'a.

Authority 
According to the constitution of Yemen, the President of Yemen serves as the commander-in-chief of Yemen Armed Forces and is responsible for appointing the defense minister. On 19 December 2012, President Abdrabbuh Mansur Hadi, issued a presidential decree to restructure the armed forces into five main branches: the air force and the air defense, the Navy and coastal defense, the land forces, the border guard, and the strategic reserve. The decision included also the division of the military field across the country into seven military regions.

Military regions 

 1st Military Region in Seyoun, Hadramout. 
 2nd Military Region in Mukkala, Hadramawt.
 3rd Military Region in Marib governorate.
 4th Military Region in Aden.
 5th Military Region in Hajjah.
 6th Military Region in Amran.
 7th Military Region in Dhamar.

List of ministers of defense 
Republic of Yemen (1990– present)

See also 
 Republic of Yemen Armed Forces
 National Defence Council (Yemen)

References 

Defence ministers of Yemen
Ministry of Defense (Yemen)
Government ministries of Yemen